Contract to Kill is a 2016 American action film starring Steven Seagal. It received a limited theatrical release in the United States, and was released via video on demand.

Plot
U.S. Immigration and Customs Enforcement (ICE) border patrol agents apprehend two "other than Mexican" migrants affiliated with Al-Qaeda in the Arabian Peninsula (AQAP) and Daesh; the Central Intelligence Agency (CIA) suspects that the terrorists are negotiating a deal with the Sonora Cartel – headed by José Rivera (Mircea Drambareanu) – to smuggle terrorists from Mexico into the United States. Former Drug Enforcement Administration (DEA) and CIA Agent John Harmon (Steven Seagal), who had raided a Sonora compound and killed its previous leader, El Mini Oso, is enlisted by CIA intermediary Matt Beck (Andrei Stanciu) to end the extremists' plot.

Harmon recruits old flame and Federal Bureau of Investigation (FBI) agent Zara Hayek (Jemma Dallender) and United States Army Special Forces/CIA-trained spy-drone pilot Matthew Sharp (Russell Wong) after learning that the meeting between the terrorist coalition and the Sonora Cartel will be in Istanbul, Turkey. In Istanbul, Harmon's team spy on Hezbollah leader Ayan Al-Mujahid (Sergiu Costache) and Rivera but the meeting is cut short and adjourned after al-Mujahid notices Sharp's drone.

Following a brief car chase and shootout between Harmon and al-Mujahid's men, Harmon learns from Beck that the real target is Abdul Rauf (Ghassan Bouz), the bomb-maker responsible for the downing of a Crimea Airlines plane in Syria. Rivera's men raid Harmon's safehouse and abduct Hayek; Harmon and Sharp locate and kill Al-Mujahid and his men at the Palace Hotel. Rivera and Rauf escape to the former's compound in Rumelifeneri but are tracked down by Harmon, who shoots them in the neck and head respectively, before embracing Hayek. The film ends with Harmon musing about the necessity of operatives like himself.

Production
The film was shot in Romania.

Cast
 Steven Seagal as John Harmon
 Russell Wong as Matthew Sharp
 Jemma Dallender as Zara Hayek
 Mircea Drambareanu as Jose Rivera
 Sergiu Costache as Ayan Al-Mujahid
 Ghassan Bouz as Abdul Rauf
 Andrei Stanciu as Matt Beck

Reception
On review aggregator Rotten Tomatoes, the film holds a 0% approval rating based on 5 reviews, with an average rating of 1.2/10. Metacritic, using a weighted average, assigned the film a score of 3 out of 100 based on 5 critics, indicating "overwhelming dislike".

The A.V. Club reviewer Ignatiy Vishnevetsky described Contract to Kill as "Steven Seagal bad", writing that "objectively, Contract To Kill is the most carelessly made movie to be released theatrically by a major studio in a few years; its standards may even be called negligent. It belongs in a museum, along with all of the other Seagal curios." Writing for RogerEbert.com, Odie Henderson gave the film one star, criticising in particular the acting, editing, special effects, and "inane" plot. The Hollywood Reporter Frank Scheck was especially critical of Seagal's lacklustre performance in Contract to Kill, and summarised the film as "laughably inept on every technical level and representing the sort of badness that falls far short of being campy fun". Kimber Myers of the Los Angeles Times similarly noted Seagal's "completely bored" delivery, though conceding that the film "will probably please fans of Seagal's work".

References

External links
 
 
 
 Contract to Kill at The Numbers

2016 films
American action films
2016 action films
Films about terrorism
Films about Mexican drug cartels
Films directed by Keoni Waxman
2010s English-language films
2010s American films
2010s Mexican films